The Monte Ceneri Road Tunnel is a motorway tunnel in the Swiss canton of Ticino. The tunnel is situated under the Monte Ceneri Pass that separates the north of the canton around Bellinzona from the south of the canton around Lugano. It forms part of the A2 motorway that links the north of Switzerland with Italy.

References 

Transport in Ticino
Road tunnels in Switzerland